Shanxi Coking Coal Group Co., Ltd. is a Chinese state-owned coal mining conglomerate and a holding company, as one of the seven coal conglomerates that had a production capability of over 100 million metric tons in China in 2011. 
Shanxi Coking Coal Group was ranked 337th in 2016 Fortune Global 500.

The holding company is the parent of three publicly traded companies: Nafine Chemical Industry Group, Shanxi Coking Company and Xishan Coal and Electricity Power.

As at 31 December 2015, Shanxi Coking Coal Group had a mining capability of 86.9 million metric tons per year, according to National Energy Administration, with some capability were not disclosed, such as Shaqu mine of Huajin Coking Coal.

In 2011 Shanxi Coking Coal Group is the largest Chinese miner for coking coal (metallurgical coal). According to the company, the group produced 105.35 million tons of coal and 9.62 million tons of coke, plus 13 billion kWh of electricity in 2015. According to the International Energy Agency, Shanxi Coking Coal Group was ranked 4th in 2006 in China by sales mass of coal.

History
Shanxi Coking Coal Group was found in 2001 as the holding company of Fenxi Mining Industry Group, Xishan Coal Electricity Group and Huozhou Coal Electricity Group. The stake of Xishan Coal and Electricity Power was also acquired from Xishan Coal Electricity Group in 2001. The group also formed a joint venture Huajin Coking Coal in the same year. In 2004, Shanxi Coking Coal Group became the parent company of Shanxi Coking Group. It was followed by Yuncheng Salt Group in 2012 and Shanxi Coke Group in 2013.

Fenxi Mining Industry Group
Fenxi Mining Industry (Group) Co., Ltd., based in Fenxi County, Linfen, was founded in 1956 as Fenxi Mining Bureau. In 2000 it was incorporated as a limited company. It became part of Shanxi Coking Coal Group in 2001. In 2005 China Construction Bank, China Cinda Asset Management and China Huarong Asset Management became minority shareholders by debt-to-equity swap.

Huajin Coking Coal
Huajin Coking Coal Co., Ltd. was incorporated in 2001 as a 50-50 joint venture of Shanxi Coking Coal Group and China Coal Energy. In 2011, "Shanxi China Coal Huajin Energy" was split from the company. Both companies recapitalized, which Huajin Coking Coal was under Shanxi Coking Coal Group for 51% stake, while Huajin Energy was under China Coal Energy for 51% stake.

In 2014 the 49% minority stake in "Huajin Energy" was injected to group's wholly owned subsidiary Shanxi Coking Group. In April 2016 it was announced it would sold to listed subsidiary Shanxi Coking in a cash plus new shares deal.

Huozhou Coal Electricity Group
Huozhou Coal Electricity Group Co., Ltd. was founded in 1958 in Huozhou, Linfen as Huo Country Mining Bureau (Huo Country became Huozhou in 1989). In 2000 it was incorporated as a limited company. It became part of Shanxi Coking Coal Group in 2001.

As at 31 December 2015, the other shareholders were China Construction Bank and China Cinda Asset Management. They acquired the stake by debt-to-equity swap.

Shanxi Coke Group
Shanxi Coke Group Co., Ltd. was founded in 2002. The company specialized in coke and methanol making. It became part of Shanxi Coking Coal Group in 2013, transferred from Shanxi Coal Transportation and Sales Group.

Shanxi Coking Group
Shanxi Coking Group Co., Ltd. based in Hongtong County, Linfen, was founded in 1969 as Hongtong Coking Factory. In 1995, a subsidiary, Shanxi Coking Company, was formed to float the coke making factory in the stock exchange. The other assets remained unlisted. Shanxi Coking Group became a wholly own subsidiary of Shanxi Coking Coal Group in 2004.

In 2014 Shanxi Coking Group received 49% stake of Huajin Energy from the parent company; the stake would be sell to Shanxi Coking for cash and new shares, as announced in April 2016.

Xishan Coal Electricity Group

Xishan Coal Electricity (Group) Co., Ltd. was founded in 1956 as Xishan Mining Bureau. In 1998 the organization was incorporated as a limited company. In 1999 a subsidiary Xishan Coal and Electricity Power was incorporated and floated on Shenzhen Stock Exchange in 2000. Xishan Coal Electricity Group became a subsidiary of Shanxi Coking Coal Group in 2001. The stake in the listed company was also transferred from Xishan Coal Electricity Group to the parent company that year.

Xishan Coal and Electricity Power

Yuncheng Salt Group

Subsidiaries

 Fenxi Mining Industry Group (59.45%)
 Huajin Coking Coal (51%)
 Huozhou Coal Electricity Group (58.80%)
 Shanxi Coking Group (100%)
 Shanxi Coking Company (combined 25.72% voting rights with Xishan Coal and Electricity Power)
 Shanxi Coke Group (100%)
 Xishan Coal Electricity Group (52.34%)
Xishan Coal and Electricity Power (54.40%)
 Yuncheng Salt Group (82.51%)
 Nafine Chemical Industry Group (25.69%)

See also 

 2009 Shanxi mine blast

References

External links
 
 Official website of Fenxi Mining Industry Group
 Official website of Huozhou Coal Electricity Group
 Official website of Shanxi Coke Group
 Official website of Shanxi Coking (Group)
 Official website of Yuncheng Salt Group

Coal companies of China
Chemical companies of China
Companies owned by the provincial government of China
Chinese companies established in 2001
Energy companies established in 2001
Non-renewable resource companies established in 2001
Companies based in Taiyuan
Holding companies of China